Susanne Kappeler (born 1949) was a lecturer in English at the University of East Anglia and an associate professor at the School of Humanities and Social Sciences, Al Akhawayn University, and now works as a freelance writer and teacher in England and Germany. Kappeler also taught 'The literary representation of women' in the Faculty of English at Cambridge while a research fellow at Jesus College, Cambridge and was a part-time tutor for the Open University Course, 'The Changing Experience of Women', and is part of a collective setting up the Cambridge Women's Resources Centre.

Publications
 Kappeler, Susanne, Mira Renka, and Melanie Beyer. Vergewaltigung, Krieg, Nationalismus: eine feministische Kritik. München: Frauenoffensive, 1994. 
Teaching the Text co-ed. with Norman Bryson. Routledge, 1983. 
Writing and Reading in Henry James, Columbia University Press, 1980, 
Review by  Paul B. Armstrong,  1983. Nineteenth-Century Fiction 38, no. 1: 122-124.
Pornography of Representation, University of Minnesota Press and Polity Press, 1986, 
Review by Charlotte Hogsett, South Atlantic Review, Jan., 1988, vol. 53, no. 1, p. 99-101
Review by  Beverley Brown; 	Journal of Law and Society, Winter, 1989, vol. 16, no. 4, p. 512-518
Review by 	Ellen Rooney, Novel: A Forum on Fiction, Autumn, 1988, vol. 22, no. 1, p. 106-110
Verena Loewensberg: Betrachtungen zum Werk einer konstruktiven Malerin (in German), ABC Verlag, 1988, 
Kappeler, Susanne, and Carlo Vivarelli. Carlo Vivarelli: Plastik, Malerei, Gebrauchsgraphik = Carlo Vivarelli : sculpture, painting, graphic design. Zürich: ABC Verlag, 1988. 
Der Wille zur Gewalt: Politik des persönlichen Verhaltens (in German), Frauenoffensive, 1994, ; in English: The Will to Violence, Columbia University Teachers College Press and Spinifex Press, 1995, a book that analyses "the way in which the psychotherapeutic professions work to develop a culture of irresponsibility in personal relationships"

References

External links 
Spinifex Press on Kappeler
Review of "The Pornography of Representation" on JSTOR

British non-fiction writers
Living people
Academic staff of Al Akhawayn University
Academics of the University of East Anglia
Place of birth missing (living people)
Fellows of Jesus College, Cambridge
British expatriates in Morocco
1949 births